The 2020 season was Stabæk's 24th season in the top flight of Norwegian football.

Season events
On 12 June, the Norwegian Football Federation announced that a maximum of 200 home fans would be allowed to attend the upcoming seasons matches.

On 10 September, the Norwegian Football Federation cancelled the 2020 Norwegian Cup due to the COVID-19 pandemic in Norway.

On 30 September, the Minister of Culture and Gender Equality, Abid Raja, announced that clubs would be able to have crowds of 600 at games from 12 October.

Squad

Transfers

Winter

In:

  

Out:

Summer

In:

Out:

Competitions

Eliteserien

Results summary

Results by match

Results

Table

Norwegian Cup

Squad statistics

Appearances and goals

|-
|colspan="14"|Players away from Stabæk on loan:
|-
|colspan="14"|Players who appeared for Stabæk no longer at the club:

|}

Goalscorers

Clean sheets

Disciplinary record

References

Stabæk Fotball seasons
Stabæk